Masbar is the name of ward number 7 in Pokhara metropolitan city in Nepal.

References

Wards of Pokhara